Zhang Linyan (born 16 January 2001 in Jiangyou) is a female Chinese football player, who is a member of the China squad for 2022 AFC Women's Asian Cup.

In July 2022, Zhang joined Swiss Women's Super League club Grasshopper Club Zürich from the Chinese Women's Super League club Wuhan Jianghan University F.C.

International goals

References 

Chinese women's footballers
Living people
2001 births
Women's association footballers not categorized by position